The 2019–20 National Premier League is the 46th season of the National Premier League, the top division football competition in Jamaica. The season kicked off on 1 September 2019. On March 12, 2020, the season entered a lengthy suspension due to the COVID-19 pandemic, following the cancellation of several matches. Three days later, the Jamaica Football Federation officially cancelled the season on 15 March 2020 as part of its effort to help contain the pandemic.

Teams
Montego Bay United and Reno finished 11th and 12th, respectively, at the conclusion of the 2018–19 National Premier League season and were relegated to the Western Confederation Super League, their respective regional Super League. The two teams promoted from the 2018-19 National Playoff were Vere United and Molynes United.

Regular season
The season completed 29 matches for most teams. When the JFF announced the suspension of play it was determined that no champion would be declared for any league and no teams would be promoted or relegated; the season was declared null and void.

Results

Top goalscorers

Goal totals reflect statistics up to suspension of 2019–20 season.

References

External links
Premier League Jamaica

National Premier League seasons
1
Jamaica